Hamilton Smith may refer to:

 Hamilton Lanphere Smith (1819–1903), American scientist, photographer, and astronomer
 Hamilton Smith (cricketer) (1884–1955), Hampshire cricketer
 Hamilton O. Smith (born 1931), American microbiologist and Nobel laureate